The Saddest Landscape is an American Screamo band formed in 2002 in Boston, Massachusetts. They have released five studio albums, the latest two of them through Topshelf Records.

History
The Saddest Landscape formed in 2002. Besides numerous EPs and splits, they have released five studio albums: The Sound of the Spectacle, released in 2003 on Copter Crash Records; Lift Your Burdens High for This Is Where We Cross, released in 2004 on Narshardaa Records; You Will Not Survive, released in 2010 on Cover Your Heart Records; After the Lights, released in 2012 on Topshelf Records; and Darkness Forgives, released in 2015 also on Topshelf.

Members

Current
Andy Maddox – vocals, guitar (2002–present)
Aaron Neigher – drums (2002–present)
Andy Farrell – bass
Daniel Danger – guitar

Former
Jeremiah Bertz – bass (2002–?)
Si Choi – guitar (2002–?)
Mike Saffert – guitar (2008–2010)

Eric Mauro
Mike Van Buren

Discography

Studio albums
The Sound of the Spectacle (2003)
Lift Your Burdens High for This Is Where We Cross... (2004)
You Will Not Survive (2010)
After the Lights (2012)
Darkness Forgives (2015)

EPs
Cover Your Heart (2002)
A Promise Was Made... (2005)
(I Don't Want to Miss You Anymore) (2009)
Exit Wounded (2013)
Live at New Alliance (2013)
Flexi #1 (2013)	
Flexi #2 (2013)

Singles
"Redefining Loneliness" (2012)
"Souls Worth Saving" (2015)

Splits
The Pine / The Saddest Landscape (2003)
Music Inspired by Rites of Spring Part One with Funeral Diner (2003)
The Saddest Landscape & Trophy Scars (2009)
The Saddest Landscape / Pianos Become the Teeth (2010)
The Saddest Landscape / If Footmen Tire You, What Will Horses Do? (2010)
The Saddest Landscape & We Were Skeletons (2011)
The Saddest Landscape / You Blew It! (2012)
When You Are Close, I Am Gone with My Fictions (2013)
Frameworks / The Saddest Landscape (2014)
Pet Symmetry / The Saddest Landscape (2015)

Compilations
All Is Apologized For. All Is Forgiven (2007)	
Ten Year Anniversary Box Set (2013)	
Declaring War on Nostalgia (2016)

References

External links

American screamo musical groups
Hardcore punk groups from Massachusetts
Punk rock groups from Massachusetts
Alternative rock groups from Massachusetts
Musical groups from Boston
2002 establishments in Massachusetts
Musical groups established in 2002
Musical quartets
Topshelf Records artists